is an action-adventure game developed and published by Sunsoft for the Famicom. The game was released in Japan on July 3, 1986 and has been re-released for several other platforms in video game compilations.

The first re-release was made on June 29, 2001 for the Microsoft Windows operating system as part of the Ultra 2000 Sunsoft Classic Games 2 compilation. The game was also coupled with Ikki, and its value version release, YuYu Sunsoft Kessaku-shu 2 (released July 2, 2004), and Memorial Series Sunsoft Vol.3 for the PlayStation (released December 27, 2001) which also included The Wing of Madoola, another Sunsoft game. Tōkaidō Gojūsan-tsugi was ported into a java application for mobile phones under the NTT DoCoMo operator in September 2003. It was released for the Virtual Console only in Japan on October 14, 2008 for the Wii and on September 18, 2013 for the Nintendo 3DS.

Gameplay
The player takes the role of a fireworks-maker named , who has completed his training in the city of Kyoto and seeks to return to his fiancée, who lives in Edo. However, the evil merchant  seeks to steal the secrets of fireworks manufacturing from Kantaro, and summons his cronies to harass him as he makes his way through the Tōkaidō route. Kantaro must defend himself by throwing firework grenades to fend off enemies. However, certain enemies are unaffected by grenades, and can only be killed off by explosions from grenades planted on the ground.

Enemy characters
Bolded numbers are the number of points yielded when each enemy is killed.
 100 pts
The generic thug enemy. They jump around trying to ram into Kantaro, but can be dispatched easily.
 100 pts
The game's ninja enemy has the same abilities as Goro-taro, but appears on different levels.
 1000 pts 
This enemy is a ronin who deflects all grenade attacks using his sword. He can only be defeated by grenades exploding at his feet, whether thrown or planted on the ground.
 300 pts
This enemy uses a trained hawk to attack Kantaro from afar. The hawk is invincible while in flight but can be taken out if Genji is defeated while the bird is still perching on his shoulder.  Otherwise it will loiter where he falls.
 200 pts
This professional assassin appears under bridges, and tries to skewer Kantaro from below using a long spear. These enemies are safe from explosions unless they come out from under the bridge.
 300 pts
Another assassin hired to kill Kantaro. This type appears on building roofs, outside of the range of grenades, and attacks with throwing knives. The assassin will also pursue Kantaro at rapid speed if he attempts to pass below. One of the hardest enemies to kill off.
 2000 pts
The monk, Tenkai, shoots beams at Kantaro with his psychic powers. Tenkai is difficult to hit with a grenade, and will avoid grenades planted on the ground.
 3000 pts
The main antagonist of the game attacks Kantaro using an arquebus, firing three times before retreating. Two grenade hits are needed to defeat this character.

Some characters are not necessarily enemies, but may hamper the player's progress. Kantaro can pass through the checkpoint if he has the passport item, but must pay 6 Koban coins if he does not. The officer will begin to attack Kantaro if he cannot pay the passage fee. These characters will not affect Kantaro if he is in possession of certain items (for instance, the kanzashi item will void Otami's advances, and the katana item will defend Kantaro from the thief), and they will cease to pursue Kantaro after a short period of time.

The kite ninja moves across the top part of the game screen while dropping shuriken, and the stray dog will appear on the left side of the screen, and run off to the right side, injuring Kantaro if he is in the way. A huge rolling rock may also appear in place of the stray dog on certain levels.

Items
Items will appear if Kantaro uses his firework grenades in certain locations. Koban coins can be found throughout each map, and 2 coins can be used to create bridges to cross over rivers (2 coins are always hidden around each river area), 6 coins can pay the passage fee at the checkpoints if the player does not have a passport, and 10 coins can open a secret passageway into other levels (see #Secrets). The kanzashi item does not appear in the original Family Computer version (Otami will go away if Kantaro has 4 coins), but in other installments, it prevents Otami from following Kantaro around. The O-fuda (Japanese amulet) item will protect Kantaro from the ghost character, and the katana will do the same against the thief. The onigiri (rice ball) item will transform Kantaro into a rolling ball, making him invincible for a short period of time unless he falls into a pit. The geta (sandal) item allows Kantaro to stand on top of clouds.

Levels
Each level of the game is named and modeled after the 53 Stations of the Tōkaidō; one of the Five Routes of Edo during the Tokugawa era. The following is a list of the levels and their corresponding location on the map (all names are written in hiragana in the game itself).

Level 1: Sanjō Ōhashi (the location name does not appear game itself, but is the last station on the Tōkaidō road)
Level 2: Kyoto―Kusatsu
Level 3: Ishibe―Tsuchiyama
Level 4: Sakashita―Seki
Level 5: Kameyama―Shōno
Level 6: Ishiyakushi―Kuwana
Level 7: Miya―Chiryū
Level 8: Okazaki―Akasaka
Level 9: Goyu―Futagawa
Level 10: Shirasuka―Maisaka
Level 11: Hamamatsu―Fukuroi
Level 12: Kakegawa―Shimada
Level 13: Fujieda―Mariko
Level 14: Fuchū―Yui
Level 15: Kanbara―Hara
Level 16: Numazu―Hakone
Level 17: Odawara―Hiratsuka
Level 18: Fujisawa―Hodogaya
Level 19: Kanagawa―Kawasaki
Level 20: Shinagawa―Nihonbashi
Level 21: Asakusa (unrelated to the Tōkaidō route itself, but is the final destination of the game)

Each level is designed in accordance with the actual characteristics of the locations. For instance, checkpoints are placed relative to their actual historical locations, and the prostitute character only appears in areas where such business was actually available, such as Akasaka, Goyu, Fujisawa, and Shinagawa. Kuwana Castle and Yoshida Castle also appear in the game, while Atsuta Shrine and Mishima Taisha are each represented by a Torii shrine. Locations of rivers, hills, rest stops and types of trees are also set according to each area's geographical characteristics.

Secrets
A black doorway will appear on the game screen when the player gathers 10 gold coins. This is an entrance to one of two secret areas. One area contains a large number of items, and only features the generic ninja enemy (Kuromaru), while the other contains no items, and is filled with powerful enemies such as monks and ronin. The area accessed is chosen randomly when the entrance appears, and the completion of the easier secret area will allow the player to skip 3 levels, while completing the more difficult area will skip 6 levels.

External links
Memorial Series: SunSoft Vol. 3 webpage

1986 video games
Sunsoft games
Nintendo Entertainment System games
Japan-exclusive video games
Mobile games
Action-adventure games
Video games developed in Japan
Virtual Console games
Virtual Console games for Wii U
Multiplayer and single-player video games